Charles-Antoine Clevenbergh (14 July 1755 – 6 January 1810) was a Flemish painter of still-life.

Clevenbergh was born in Louvain in 1755. He studied historical painting under Verhaeghen, and made large pen-and-ink drawings, which possess much merit. He died in 1810.

References
 

1755 births
1810 deaths
Artists from Leuven
18th-century Flemish painters
Flemish still life painters